PharMerica is a Fortune 1000 company formed in January 2007 from the merger of Kindred Healthcare's pharmacy business with a subsidiary of AmerisourceBergen.

The company is headquartered in Louisville, Kentucky, and operates a major customer support center in Tampa, Florida.

Overview 
PharMerica's main clients are senior living communities, nursing facilities, public health organizations and post-acute care organizations. Its affiliates are Pharmacy Alternatives, PropacPayless, ChemRX, and CIPRx.

The company is the second largest in the institutional pharmacy services market, with revenues of $1.9 billion and a customer base of 330,000 "beds" in 41 U.S. states.

In August 2011, pharmacy services provider Omnicare made a bid of $457 million for all outstanding shares of PharMerica. The Federal Trade Commission sued Omnicare to block the deal on the basis that the FTC believed the acquisition would lead to higher drug prices. In February 2012, Omnicare allowed its offer to the shareholders of PharMerica to expire.

In August 2017, CNBC reported that PharMerica was to be acquired by KKR, in a deal worth $1.4 billion, including debt.

Units 
The company has several departments:

 ValueMed
Long-Term Care
Amerita (specialty & home infusion)
Onco360 (oncology pharmacy)

References

External links

PharMerica website

Pharmacies of the United States
Companies based in Louisville, Kentucky
Companies formerly listed on the New York Stock Exchange
Retail companies established in 2007
American companies established in 2007
2007 establishments in Kentucky
Health care companies based in Kentucky
2017 mergers and acquisitions
Kohlberg Kravis Roberts companies